Quinault (Kʷínaył) is a member of the Tsamosan (Olympic) branch of the Coast Salish family of Salishan languages.

Phonology

Vowels are represented as /i ə u a/ and /iː uː aː/.

References

Coast Salish languages
Quinault